Ron Lord (born 25 July 1929) is a former Australian international football (soccer) goalkeeper during the 1950s, appearing for the host nation in the 1956 Olympic Games staged in Melbourne. Lord played well in the defeat of the Japanese side, but the Australians were well-defeated by India where Neville D'Souza scored the first and, so far, only hat-trick by an Asian football in either a FIFA World Cup or Olympic Games tournament.

Lord initially played for Australia in the early-1950s taking over duties between-the-posts from the famous Norman Conquest.

References

External links
Oz Football profile
Oz Football interview

1929 births
Living people
People from New South Wales
Australian soccer players
Australia international soccer players
Footballers at the 1956 Summer Olympics
Olympic soccer players of Australia
Association football goalkeepers
Sydney FC Prague players